James Ritchie (25 December 1925 – 2003) was a Scottish footballer who played for Alloa Athletic, Hamilton and Dumbarton.

References

1925 births
2003 deaths
Scottish footballers
Dumbarton F.C. players
Hamilton Academical F.C. players
Alloa Athletic F.C. players
Scottish Football League players
Association football goalkeepers